Johanna Heldmann (born 31 August 1995) is a German handball player for Buxtehuder SV in the Frauen Handball-Bundesliga.

Heldmann represented the German junior national team, where she participated at the 2014 Women's Junior World Handball Championship, placing 4th.

In March 2020, Heldmann signed a 2-year contract with the Bundesliga club Buxtehuder SV.

Achievements
Bundesliga:
Bronze: 2013
DHB-Pokal:
Finalist: 2012

References

External links

1995 births
Living people
German female handball players
People from Bonn
Sportspeople from Bonn